Artemisia chamaemelifolia is a European and Middle Eastern species of plant in the  daisy family.

Description
Leaves are pinnatisect, are green coloured and are either hairless or have minimum amount of it. Flowers are yellow in colour and have glabrous corollas.

Distribution
It is found in Bulgaria in western Ponor on Golyama Mogila and Torlovichka Mogila mountains and in Ostriya Vrah village. It is also native to European and Asian mountains such as the Alps, Cantabria, Caucasus, Stara Planina, and in Asia Minor and northern Iran.

Habitat

Conservation status
Artemisia chamaemelifolia is considered to be Critically endangered due to low population and specification of habitat.

References

chamaemelifolia
Flora of Asia
Flora of Europe
Plants described in 1779